Anisoscelis scutellaris is a species of leaf-footed bug in the family Coreidae endemic to Colombia. It was first described by Swedish entomologist Carl Stål in 1870.

References 

Insects described in 1870
scutellaris